Hibi Eden (born 19 April 1983) is an Indian politician from Ernakulam, Kerala and member of the Indian National Congress. Hibi is the son of the late George Eden, a long time member of Parliament from the Ernakulam constituency.

Early life
Hibi Eden was born in Ernakulam, Kerala to the former Ernakulam MP, the late Sri. George Eden (who died in office, 2003) and Smt. Rani Edenon at Thoppumpady, Ernakulam on 19 April 1983. He has a younger sister. He lost his mother at an early age and he and his younger sister were raised by their aunt.

Hibi Eden was elected as a member of the Legislative Assembly of Kerala from Ernakulam District in 2011. Hibi was also the president of the NSUI, the National students wing of The Indian National Congress.

Personal life
Hibi Eden is married to Anna Linda, a Malayalam channel anchor on 30 January 2012 at Kaloor St Francis Xavier church after 4 years of love. The couple has a daughter Clara Eden born on 27 November 2012. Hibi is a devout member of the Keralite Latin Catholic community.

Political career

Hibi Eden was the general secretary of the KSU led Union at Sacred Heart College, Thevara. He then became the State Committee President of the Kerala Students Union which he held until 2009. He was an ex President of the nsu(i) National Students Union of India. He was highly favored to stand as the Indian National Congress candidate in the Ernakulam (Lok Sabha constituency) for the 2009 Indian general election.

He was the Member of the Legislative Assembly of Kerala from Ernakulam constituency winning the 2011 Kerala Assembly elections by a 32,437 vote majority making him the youngest member in the Assembly.. In 2016 assembly elections, He got elected for the second time as the Member of the Legislative Assembly of Kerala from Ernakulam constituency winning by 21949 votes. In 2019 Loksabha election he contested from Ernakulam (Lok Sabha constituency) and Eden won by a margin of over 1.6 lakh votes against his nearest rival, P. Rajeev (Kerala) of CPI(M).

Represented India in the Commonwealth Country Seminar held at Samova Island and presented a paper on ‘Parliament and Civil Society’. Represented a ten member Kerala Assembly delegation to China in 2012. Represented INC as a member of Multiparty delegation invited by Singapore High Commission in 2013. Represented India in the Indo-Pak delegation to American Council of Young Political Leaders (ACYPL) held in US in 2014. Represented India in the European Union Visitors Programme in 2015. Attended the Conference of the Regions conducted as the preparatory session of the World Climate Change Conference in Lyon, France (2015) and presented a paper on 'Transport and mobility'.

References

External links

 

1983 births
Living people
Indian National Congress politicians from Kerala
People from Ernakulam district
Kerala MLAs 2011–2016
Kerala MLAs 2016–2021
Indian Roman Catholics
India MPs 2019–present